Manali River is a major tributary of the Karuvannur River of the Thrissur district in Kerala. The Manali river along with the Kurumali river merge together and form the Karuvannur river at palakadavu. The Peechi Dam was constructed in Manali River.

References

Rivers of Thrissur district